Joffrin is a French surname. Notable people with the surname include:

Jules François Alexandre Joffrin (1846–1890), French politician
Laurent Joffrin, editor-in-chief of Le Nouvel Observateur

See also
Jules Joffrin (Paris Métro), station on Line 12 of the Paris Métro

French-language surnames